The 1987 McDonald's All-American Boys Game was an All-star basketball game played on Sunday, April 12, 1987 at The Spectrum in Philadelphia, Pennsylvania. The game's rosters featured the best and most highly recruited high school boys graduating in 1987. The game was the 10th annual version of the McDonald's All-American Game first played in 1978.

1987 game
The game was telecast live by ABC. The rosters notably had many forwards: the East had Brian Shorter and Perry Carter, while the West had Larry Johnson and Marcus Liberty, two of the top ranked prospect of their class. The game saw the East gaining and advantage during the first half, and at halftime the score was 66-52. The West attempted to come back during the second half, but they were unable to outscore the East and eventually lost the game by 10 points. Shorter, who was attending Oak Hill Academy but was born in Philadelphia, scored 24 points and recorded 8 rebounds, while Marcus Liberty scored 18 points; Larry Johnson had 16 and Mark Macon scored 14. Macon's good overall performance earned him the MVP award. Of the 25 players, 15 went on to play at least 1 game in the NBA.

East roster

West roster

Coaches
The East team was coached by:
 Head Coach Mark Levin of Overbrook High School (Philadelphia, Pennsylvania)

The West team was coached by:
 Head Coach Dave Lebo of Carlisle High School (Carlisle, Pennsylvania)

All-American Week

Contest winners 
 The 1987 Slam Dunk contest was won by Jerome Harmon.

References

External links
McDonald's All-American on the web
McDonald's All-American all-time rosters
McDonald's All-American rosters at Basketball-Reference.com
Game stats at Realgm.com

1986–87 in American basketball
1987
1987 in sports in Pennsylvania
Basketball competitions in Philadelphia
1980s in Philadelphia